Petronila may refer to: 
Petronila, Texas, a municipality in southern Texas
Petronila Creek, a small river near Petronila, Texas
Petronila of Aragon, 12th-century queen of Aragon

See also
 Petronilla